The Southern California Lazers were an American soccer club based in Torrance, California that was a member of the American Soccer League.

History
The Lazers were formed in 1978 as an ASL expansion franchise in suburban Los Angeles and owned by real estate developer Jack Young, who formerly owned local rival Los Angeles Skyhawks.

The club hired veteran English defender Laurie Calloway as head coach - the first opportunity of a coaching career that would include stints in the North American Soccer League and Major League Soccer. 
Arguably the biggest name on the roster was Rildo, the former Brazilian international defender who teamed with Pele on Brazil's national team, Santos FC, and the New York Cosmos. With 14 goals, forward Sid Wallace led the Lazers in scoring. Goalkeeper John Granville led the league with a 0.99 goals against average and posted seven clean sheets. Four Lazers players (Rildo, Wallace, Granville, and defender Paul Cahill) were voted by the league's coaches to the ASL All Star team at season's end.

The Lazers enjoyed a successful regular season at 15-8-1 to place third in the Western Division and received a postseason berth. However, they fell in the first round of the ASL playoffs to the California Sunshine by a score of 2–1. Despite having the second highest attendance of all ASL clubs in 1978, the club folded after their debut season.

Coach

 Laurie Calloway
 Jimmy Melia Assistant Coach

1978 Roster

 Sid Wallace
 Rildo
 John Granville
 Paul Cahill
 Paul Johnson
 Keith Walley
 Charlie Kadupski
 Bernie Fagan
 Jack Howarth
 John McGeady
 Ignacio Salcedo
 Frank Towers

Year-by-year

References

Soccer clubs in Greater Los Angeles
Defunct soccer clubs in California
American Soccer League (1933–1983) teams
Torrance, California
Soccer clubs in California
1978 establishments in California
1978 disestablishments in California
Association football clubs established in 1978
Association football clubs disestablished in 1978